Leonard A. Santillan (born March 5, 1996) is a Filipino professional basketball player for the Rain or Shine Elasto Painters of the Philippine Basketball Association (PBA).

PBA career statistics

As of the end of 2022–23 season

Season-by-season averages

|-
| align=left | 
| align=left | Rain or Shine
| 23 || 14.5 || .424 || .333 || .684 || 4.2 || .5 || .2 || .3 || 5.9
|-
| align=left | 
| align=left | Rain or Shine
| 34 || 23.9 || .399 || .266 || .667 || 6.0 || .9 || .4 || .4 || 10.5
|-class=sortbottom
| align="center" colspan=2 | Career
| 57 || 20.1 || .406 || .281 || .671 || 5.3 || .7 || .3 || .3 || 8.6

References

1996 births
Living people
Filipino men's basketball players
De La Salle Green Archers basketball players
Maharlika Pilipinas Basketball League players
Power forwards (basketball)
Rain or Shine Elasto Painters players
Rain or Shine Elasto Painters draft picks
UV Green Lancers basketball players